Ambika (pronounced "Ahm′-bik-uh") is an Indian given name. The name Ambika is a derivative name from Durga Ma. One meaning of it is the Goddess of the Moon or the Warrior Goddess. In Sanskrit word  is "mother". Variants include Ambikah, Ambyka, and Ambykah.

People with the name

Ambica
Ambica Banerjee (1928–2013), Indian politician
Ambica Charan Mazumdar (1850–1922), Indian politician
Ambica Shrestha, Nepalese entrepreneur

Ambika
 Ambika Anand (born 1980), Indian TV anchor
 Ambika Bumb, American chief executive and scientist
 Ambika Chakrabarty (1892–1962), Bengali revolutionary
 Ambika Charan Choudhury (1930–2011), Assamese academic and activist
 Ambika Charan Guha (1843–1900), Indian wrestler
 Ambika Dutt Ranga (1919–1990), Indian footballer
 Ambika Mod, British actress
 Ambika Mohan, Indian actress in Malayalam films
 Ambika Pillai, Indian makeup artist
 Ambika Sanwa, Nepalese politician
 Ambika Sharan Singh (1922–1977), Bihar freedom fighter and politician
 Ambika Soni (born 1942), Indian politician
 Ambika Sukumaran, Indian actress in Malayalam films
 Ambika, Bar Raja, Ahom Queen Consort

See also
 Ambika (disambiguation)

References

Indian masculine given names
Indian feminine given names